North East FestivalNorth East Festival Delhi is an annual festival held in Delhi which showcases the culture and customs of Northeast India. The festival is organised by Trend MMS a Socio-Cultural Trust led by the well-known entrepreneur, social influencer, and infrastructure project specialist Shyamkanu Mahanta. The 10th Edition of North East Festival will be held on 23 to 26 December 2022 at Gate No. 14 of Jawaharlal Nehru Stadium, New Delhi. Tickets are available on insider.in

In this edition, North East Festival will showcase the best of North East India’s cultural resources in Delhi. North East Festival holds the regard for hosting the best music festival in Delhi and is an enticing gateway for the exceptional talents of NE. Northeast Festival has been organizing the best of fashion shows in terms of promoting the fresh and finest designers, weavers and top models of the region showcasing the best of fabrics of the North East India.  

Local and exotic delicacies of North East India will be presented and served by various popular restaurants during the festival. It will also have art, a photography exhibition and the list goes on!

Get ready to experience India’s Northeast all in one platform at North East Festival 2022

References 

Festivals in Delhi